The Institute of Mathematics and its Applications (IMA) is the UK's chartered professional body for mathematicians and one of the UK's learned societies for mathematics (another being the London Mathematical Society).

The IMA aims to advance mathematics and its applications, promote and foster research and other enquiries directed the advancement, teaching and application of mathematics, to seek to establish and maintain high standards of professional conduct for members and to seek to promote, encourage and guide the development of education and training in mathematics.

History
In 1959, the need for a professional and learned body for mathematics and its applications was recognised independently by both Sir James Lighthill and a committee of the heads of the mathematics departments of several colleges of technology together with some interested mathematicians from universities, industry and government research establishments. After much discussion, the name and constitution of the institute was confirmed in 1963 and the IMA was approved as a company limited by guarantee in 1964. In 1990, the institute was incorporated as a royal charter company, and it was registered as a charity in 1993.

Governance

The institute is governed via a Council, made up of between 25 and 31 individuals including a president, three past presidents, elected and co-opted members, and honorary officers.

IMA president
The president normally serves a two-year term. This is a list of the presidents of the IMA:

 1964–1966: Sir James Lighthill FRS
 1966–1967: Professor Sir Bryan Thwaites
 1968–1969: Dr Peter Wakely FRS
 1970–1971: Professor George Barnard
 1972–1973: Professor Charles Coulson FRS
 1974–1975: Sir Hermann Bondi FRS
 1976–1977: HRH The Duke of Edinburgh
 1978–1979: Dame Kathleen Ollerenshaw
 1980–1981: Sir Samuel Edwards FRS
 1982–1983: Dr Peter Trier
 1984–1985: Sir Harry Pitt FRS
 1986–1987: Professor Bob Churchhouse FRS
 1988–1989: Professor Douglas Jones FRS
 1990–1991: Sir Roy Harding
 1992: J H McDonnell
 1993–1995: Professor Lord Julian Hunt FRS
 1996–1997: Professor David Crighton FRS
 1998–1999: Professor Henry Beker
 2000–2001: Professor Stephen Reid
 2002–2003: Professor John McWhirter FREng, FRS
 2004–2005: Professor Tim Pedley FRS
 2006–2007: Professor Peter Grindrod CBE
 2008–2009: Professor David Abrahams
 2010–2011: Professor Michael Walker OBE, FRS
 2012–2013: Professor Robert MacKay FRS
 2014–2015: Professor Dame Celia Hoyles
 2016–2017: Professor Chris Linton
 2018–2019: Professor Alistair Fitt
 2020–2021: Professor Nira Chamberlain
 2022–present: Professor Paul Glendinning

Honorary officers

In addition to the president, the six honorary officer roles are listed below with their incumbents:

Membership
The IMA has 5,000 members, ten percent of whom live outside the United Kingdom. Forty percent of members are employed in education (schools through to universities) and sixty percent work in commercial and governmental organisations. The institute awards five grades of membership within three groups.

Corporate membership
Fellow (FIMA)
Fellows are peer reviewed by external reference and selected internally through election by the membership committee.  Qualifications include a minimum of seven years experience and hold a senior managerial or technical position involving the use of, or training in, mathematics.  A Fellow has made outstanding contributions to the development or application of mathematics.

Member (MIMA)
Members have an appropriate degree, a minimum period of three years training and experience after graduation and a position of responsibility involving the application of mathematical knowledge or training in mathematics.

Leading to corporate membership
Associate Member (AMIMA)
Associate Member hold a degree in mathematics, a joint degree in mathematics with another subject or a degree with a sufficient mathematical component such as would be expected in physics or engineering.

Students
Student Members are undertaking a course of study which will lead to a qualification that meets Associate Member requirements.

Non-professional membership
Affiliate
No requirements are necessary for entry into this grade.

Professional status
In 1990 the institute was incorporated by royal charter and was subsequently granted the right to award Chartered Mathematician (CMath) status. The institute may also nominate individuals for the award of Chartered Scientist (CSci) under license from the Science Council. The institute can also award individual Chartered Mathematics Teacher (CMathTeach).

Publications

Mathematics Today
Mathematics Today is a general-interest mathematics publication aimed primarily at Institute members, published six times a year and containing articles, reviews, reports and other news on developments in mathematics and its applications.

Research journals
Eight research journals are published by Oxford University Press on behalf of the IMA.

IMA Journal of Applied Mathematics
IMA Journal of Numerical Analysis
Mathematical Medicine and Biology
IMA Journal of Mathematical Control and Information
IMA Journal of Management Mathematics
Teaching Mathematics and its Applications
Information and Inference: A Journal of the IMA
Transactions of Mathematics and its Applications

Other publications
The IMA began publishing a podcast, Travels in a Mathematical World, on 4 October 2008. The IMA also publishes conference proceedings, monographs and special interest group newsletters.

Conferences
The institute runs 8–10 conferences most years. These are specialist meetings where new research is presented and discussed.

Education activities
The IMA runs a wide range of mathematical activities through the Higher Education Services Area and the Schools and Further Education Group committees.

The IMA operates a Programme Approval Scheme, which provides an 'approval in principle' for degree courses that meet the educational requirements for Chartered Mathematician. For programmes to be approved, the IMA requires the programme to be an honours degree of at least three years length, which meets the required mathematical content threshold of two-thirds. The programmes also need to meet the QAA benchmark for Mathematics and the Framework for High Education Qualification.

The IMA provides education grants of up to £600 to allow individuals from the UK working in schools or further/higher education to help with the attendance at or the organisation of a mathematics educational activity such as attendance at a conference, expenses to cover a speaker coming into a school, organising a session for a conference.

The IMA also employs a university liaison officer to promote mathematics and the IMA to university students undertaking mathematics and help act as a means of support. As part of this support the IMA runs the University Liaison Grants Scheme to provide university mathematical societies with grants of up to £400 to organise more activities and work more closely with the IMA.

Prizes
The councils of the IMA and the London Mathematical Society jointly award the Christopher Zeeman Medal, dedicated to recognising excellence in the communication of mathematics and the David Crighton Award dedicated to the recognition of service to mathematics and the wider mathematics community.

The IMA in cooperation with the British Applied Mathematics Colloquium (BAMC) award the biennial IMA Lighthill-Thwaites Prize for early career applied mathematicians.

The IMA awards the Leslie Fox Prize for Numerical Analysis, the Catherine Richards Prize for the best articles in Mathematics Today, the John Blake University Teaching Medal and the IMA Gold Medal for outstanding contribution to mathematics and its applications over the years.

The IMA awards student-level prizes at most universities which offer mathematics around the UK. Each student prize is a year's membership of the IMA.

Branches

The IMA has Branches in the regions London, East Midlands, Lancashire and the North West, West Midlands, West of England, Ireland and Scotland, which run local activities (like talks by well known mathematicians). Its headquarters are in Southend-on-Sea, Essex.

Early Career Mathematicians Group

The Early Career Mathematicians Group of the IMA hold a series of conferences for mathematicians in the first 15 years of their career among other activities.

Social networking

As well as all the conferences, meetings and group activities that are held across the country the IMA operates groups on Facebook and LinkedIn, and has a Twitter feed.

Interaction with other bodies

Along with the London Mathematical Society, the Royal Statistical Society, the Edinburgh Mathematical Society and the Operational Research Society, forms the Council for the Mathematical Sciences. The IMA is a member of the Joint Mathematical Council (JMC) and informs the deliberations of the Advisory Committee on Mathematics Education (ACME).

The IMA has representatives on Bath University Court, Bradford University Court, Cranfield University Court, Engineering Technology Board and Engineering Council, Engineering and Physical Sciences Research Council, EPSRC Public Understanding of Science Committee, Heads of Departments of Mathematical Sciences, International Council for Industrial and Applied Mathematics, Joint Mathematical Council, LMS Computer Science Committee, LMS International Affairs Committee, LMS Women in Maths Committee, Maths, Stats & OR Network (part of the HEA), Parliamentary and Scientific Committee, Qualifications and Curriculum Authority, Science Council, Science Council Registration Authority, The Association of Management Sciences (TAMS) and University of Wales, Swansea Court

See also
 List of Mathematical Societies
 Council for the Mathematical Sciences
 Leslie Fox Prize for Numerical Analysis

Notes

External links
 The Institute of Mathematics and its Applications
 The origins of the Institute
 Travels in a Mathematical World Podcast

1964 establishments in the United Kingdom
Education in Southend-on-Sea
Learned societies of the United Kingdom
Mathematics education in the United Kingdom
Mathematical societies
Organisations based in Essex
Organizations established in 1964
Mathematics and its Applications, Institute of